United Nations Security Council Resolution 224, adopted unanimously on October 14, 1966, after examining the application of Botswana for membership in the United Nations, the Council recommended to the General Assembly that Botswana be admitted.

See also
List of United Nations Security Council Resolutions 201 to 300 (1965–1971)

References
Text of the Resolution at undocs.org

External links
 

 0224
 0224
 0224
1966 in Botswana
October 1966 events